Elector Frederick may refer to:

 Frederick William, Elector of Brandenburg
 Frederick I, Elector of Brandenburg
 Frederick II, Elector of Brandenburg
 Frederick I, Elector Palatine
 Frederick II, Elector Palatine
 Frederick III, Elector Palatine
 Frederick IV, Elector Palatine
 Frederick V, Elector Palatine, or The Winter King, husband of Princess Elizabeth Stuart of England and Scotland
 Frederick Christian, Elector of Saxony
 Frederick I, Elector of Saxony
 Frederick Augustus I, Elector of Saxony
 Frederick II, Elector of Saxony
 Frederick III, Elector of Saxony, commonly called Frederick the Wise.